The 1992 season was Shimizu S-Pulse's first season in existence. Although selected for participation in the newly planned J1 League, the team did not play in any league during the 1992 season and instead only competed in the Emperor's Cup and the J.League Cup.

Team name
Club nameShimizu FC S-Pulse
NicknameShimizu S-Pulse

Review and events

Competitions

Domestic results

Emperor's Cup

J.League Cup

Player statistics

Transfers

In:

Out:

Transfers during the season

In
none

Out
none

References

Other pages
 J. League official site
 Shimizu S-Pulse official site

Shimizu S-Pulse
Shimizu S-Pulse seasons